Lyncestis albisigna is a species of moth in the family Erebidae. It is found in the Philippines (Luzon, Mindanao).

References

Moths described in 1920
Ophiusini